The 1923–24 Austrian First Class season was the thirteenth season of top-tier football in Austria. SV Amateure claim their first Austrian title after winning the title by four points over second place First Vienna FC. On the other end of the table, ASV Hertha, FC Ostmark and Wiener AF were all relegated to the second tier of Austrian football.

League standings

Results

References
Austria - List of final tables (RSSSF)

Austrian Football Bundesliga seasons
Austria
1923–24 in Austrian football